General elections were held in Niue on 21 March 2002 to determine the composition of the twenty member Assembly.

All twenty outgoing members were re-elected, of which eight (all of them village representatives) were running unopposed. Voter turnout was close to 100%. The Niue People's Party obtained six seats, and was able to form a government with the support of eight independent members. The remaining six seats were also held by independents.

Young Vivian (NPP) became Premier. Sani Lakatani was his deputy. Atapana Siakimotu was elected Speaker.

Results

References

Elections in Niue
Niue
2002 in Niue
Niue